Sybra latiuscula is a species of beetle in the family Cerambycidae. It was described by Per Olof Christopher Aurivillius in 1927.

References

latiuscula
Beetles described in 1927